Caudipteryx (which means "tail feather") is a genus of peacock-sized theropod dinosaurs that lived in the Barremian age of the early Cretaceous (about 124.6 million years ago). They were feathered and extremely birdlike in their overall appearance, to the point that some paleontologists think it was a bird. Two species have been described: C. zoui (the type species), in 1998, and C. dongi, in 2000.

Caudipteryx fossils were first discovered in the Yixian Formation of the Sihetun area of Liaoning Province, northeastern China in 1997.

Description
 
Like many other maniraptorans, has a mix of reptile- and bird-like anatomical features.

It had a short, boxy skull with a beak-like snout that retained only a few tapered teeth in the front of the upper jaw. It had a stout trunk, long legs and was probably a swift runner.

Its short tail was stiffened toward the tip, with few vertebrae, like in birds and other oviraptorosaurs. It has a primitive pelvis and shoulder, and primitive skull details in the quadratojugal, squamosal, quadrate, jugal, and mandibular fenestra (in the cheek, jaw, and jaw joint). It has a hand skeleton with a reduced third finger, like that of early birds and the oviraptorid Heyuannia.

Caudipteryx had uncinate processes on the ribs, birdlike teeth, a first toe which may or may not be partially reversed and overall body proportions that are comparable to those of modern flightless birds.

Paleobiology

Feathers

The primary feathers were arranged in a wing-like fan along the second finger, just like primary feathers of birds and other maniraptorans. No fossil of Caudipteryx zoui preserves any secondary feathers attached to the forearms, as found in dromaeosaurids, Archaeopteryx, and modern birds. Either these arm feathers are not preserved, or they were not present on Caudipteryx in life. An additional fan of feathers existed on its tail. The shortness and symmetry of the feathers, and the shortness of the arms relative to the body size, indicate that Caudipteryx was flightless.

The body of C. zoui was covered in black feathers, with a visible banding pattern preserved on tail feathers.

Diet
 
Caudipteryx is thought to have been an omnivore. In at least two specimens of Caudipteryx (NGMC 97 4 A and NGMC 97 9 A), gastroliths are preserved. As in some herbivorous dinosaurs, the avialan Sapeornis, and modern birds, these gastroliths remain in the position where the animals' gizzards would have been.

Paleoecology
All Caudipteryx fossils were recovered from the Yixian Formation in Liaoning, China. Specifically, they come from a small area of the Jianshangou bed, near the town of Zhangjiakou. They appear to have been fairly common, though isolated to this small region. The specific region in which Caudipteryx lived was home to the other feathered dinosaurs Dilong and Sinornithosaurus.

Implications
 
The discovery of Caudipteryx has led to many intensive studies and debate over the relationship of birds and dinosaurs. The possible positions in the debate can be summarized as follows: Caudipteryx is either a member of the Oviraptorosauria, or a bird, or both, and birds are either dinosaurs or they are not. (See the rest of this section and Phylogeny, below).

Because Caudipteryx has clear and unambiguously pennaceous feathers, like modern birds, and because several cladistic analyses have consistently recovered it as a non-avian oviraptorid dinosaur, it provided, at the time of its description, the clearest and most succinct evidence that birds evolved from dinosaurs. Lawrence Witmer stated:
“The presence of unambiguous feathers in an unambiguously non-avian theropod has the rhetorical impact of an atomic bomb, rendering any doubt about the theropod relationships of birds ludicrous.”

However, not all scientists agreed that Caudipteryx was unambiguously non-avian, and some of them continued to doubt that general consensus. Paleornithologist Alan Feduccia sees Caudipteryx as a flightless bird evolving from earlier archosaurian dinosaurs rather than from late theropods. Jones et al. (2000) found that Caudipteryx was a bird based on a mathematical comparison of the body proportions of flightless birds and non-avian theropods. Dyke and Norell (2005) criticized this result for flaws in their mathematical methods, and produced results of their own which supported the opposite conclusion.

Other researchers not normally involved in the debate over bird origins, such as Zhou, acknowledged that the true affinities of Caudipteryx were debatable.

Classification
 
The consensus view, based on several cladistic analyses, is that Caudipteryx is a basal (primitive) member of the Oviraptorosauria, and the oviraptorosaurians are non-avian theropod dinosaurs. Incisivosaurus is the only oviraptorosaur that is more primitive.

Halszka Osmólska et al. (2004) ran a cladistic analysis that came to a different conclusion. They found that the most birdlike features of oviraptorids actually place the whole clade within Aves itself, meaning that Caudipteryx is both an oviraptorid and a bird. In their analysis, birds evolved from more primitive theropods, and one lineage of birds became flightless, re-evolved some primitive features, and gave rise to the oviraptorids. This analysis was persuasive enough to be included in paleontological textbooks like Benton's Vertebrate Paleontology (2005).
The view that Caudipteryx was secondarily flightless is also preferred by Gregory S. Paul, Lü et al., and Maryańska et al.

Others, such as Stephen Czerkas and Larry Martin have concluded that Caudipteryx is not a theropod dinosaur at all. They believe that Caudipteryx, like all maniraptorans, is a flightless bird, and that birds evolved from non-dinosaurian archosaurs.

See also

 Timeline of oviraptorosaur research

References

External links
 Australian Museum: Chinese Dinosaurs: Caudipteryx zoui. Retrieved 2007-FEB-19.
 Natural History Museum of Los Angeles County: From Dinosaurs to Birds: Caudipteryx. Retrieved 2007-FEB-19.
 Research Casting International: Life-size model of Caudipteryx zoui. Retrieved 2007-FEB-19.
 CNN: Scientists: Fossils prove that birds evolved from dinosaurs. Retrieved 2007-AUG-10

Oviraptorosaurs
Feathered dinosaurs
Early Cretaceous dinosaurs of Asia
Fossils of China
Fossil taxa described in 1998
Taxa named by Philip J. Currie
Taxa named by Mark Norell
Yixian fauna